The York Club is a private social club that was incorporated on November 22, 1909. It is located at 135 St. George Street in The Annex neighbourhood of central Toronto, Ontario, Canada, close to the University of Toronto.

Clubhouse 

The club's building was originally constructed between 1889 and 1892 as a residence for businessman George Gooderham Sr. (1830–1905) and his large family. Gooderham was a son of William Gooderham (1790–1881) and served as president of the Gooderham and Worts distillery. The house was designed in the Romanesque Revival style by architect David Roberts Jr., who also designed the Gooderham Building downtown.

After Gooderham died in May 1905, at the age of 75, his widow Harriet Gooderham (née Dean) sold the house and moved to a smaller home nearby at 224 St. George Street. The York Club has owned the building since 1910.

Membership 

In 1992, The York Club's membership voted in overwhelming favour of admitting women to full membership; the initial class of female members numbered five accomplished candidates, and the club rapidly introduced them onto its Committees and Board of Directors.

Six years after that initial decision, the Toronto Ladies' Club — founded in 1904 — amalgamated with The York Club, further strengthening the latter's female membership and bringing it a renewed dynamism.

Today, the club prides itself on a diverse, accomplished membership that is reflective of the Toronto community.

References

External links 

Lost Rivers – York Club

Clubs and societies based in Toronto
Houses completed in 1892
Houses in Toronto
Romanesque Revival architecture in Canada
Organizations established in 1909
1909 establishments in Ontario